Ryan Cottage is a historic cure cottage located at Saranac Lake in the town of Harrietstown in Franklin County, New York, USA. It was built in 1893 and is a -story, wood-frame dwelling with clapboard siding on a fieldstone foundation in the Queen Anne style. It has a central hipped roof obscured by multiple gables and gable dormers. It features a wraparound verandah.

It was listed on the National Register of Historic Places in 1992.

References

Houses on the National Register of Historic Places in New York (state)
Queen Anne architecture in New York (state)
Houses completed in 1893
Houses in Franklin County, New York
National Register of Historic Places in Franklin County, New York